PTK is a 2D rendering engine and SDK developed by Phelios, Inc., that allows computer programmers create downloadable games in C++ that are portable to Microsoft Windows and Mac OS X. It is currently used by about 60 downloadable games  It is mainly known for powering breakaway casual hits from funpause and Big Fish Games, such as Azada, Atlantis, Atlantis Sky Patrol, Mystic Inn and Fairies.

Design philosophy
PTK was designed for programmers to enjoy basic-like ease of programming using the C++. It abstracts rendering, input and I/O and removes the need for directly setting up complex renderers such as DirectX or OpenGL.

PTK uses a "2D in 3D" paradigm. While it is a 2D engine, it uses 3D acceleration for rendering, enabling very good, bicubic filtered rendering of scaled, rotated sprites and per-pixel alpha blending at no expense of computing time. A game such as Mystic Inn make extensive use of PTK's rendering capabilities.

References

External links
PTK homepage at Phelios Inc
Showcase of over 60 games using PTK
Article on apple.com about game development environments, including PTK
Icee.usm.edu
Krysztofiak Patrice

Notes
Network: Trognon Patrice
Linux: Jean-Yves Lamoureux
Mac OS X HID programming: Matt Gray
TrueType, Resource packing, optimization, bug fixes: Emmanuel Marty

Computer libraries
C++ libraries